Disorder is an EP by Canadian electro-industrial band Front Line Assembly released in 1988. This was the band's first EP which was only released on Vinyl. Later Disorder was released on a record called Convergence, along with the Corrosion album.

Track listing

Personnel

Front Line Assembly
 Bill Leeb – vocals, electronic instruments
 Michael Balch – electronic instruments

Technical personnel
 Dave Ogilvie – engineering (A1, A3), mixing (A2, B1, B3)
 Eddie Stromboli – cover

References

Front Line Assembly albums
1988 EPs
Wax Trax! Records albums
Third Mind Records EPs